The Belgo-Congolese Round Table Conference was a meeting organized in two parts in 1960 in Brussels (January 20 – February 20 and April 26 – May 16) between on the one side representatives of the Congolese political class and chiefs and on the other side Belgian political and business leaders. The round table meetings led to the adoption of sixteen resolutions on the future of the Belgian Congo and its institutional reforms. With a broad consensus, the date for independence was set on June 30, 1960.

Background 
The idea for a round table conference was first formulated in 1959 by the Congolese Labour Party (PTC). It gathered support from the Bakongo Alliance (ABAKO) and the Belgian Socialist Party (PSB).
The idea of a bilateral conference aimed at organising the independence of the Belgian colony was in turn adopted by the Minister of the Belgian Congo and Ruanda-Urundi, August de Schryver, who was also the leader of the Christian Social Party, Belgium's largest political party at the time. Several factors contributed to this idea taking shape, including:

 Grassroots activism around popular figures like Joseph Kasa-Vubu and Patrice Lumumba
 The riots of January 1959 in Léopoldville, the worsening security climate and the rising feeling of insecurity among colonial settlers.
 The general sentiment of the inevitable and irreversible process of the decolonization of Africa.
 Deteriorating local economy (the public debt of the colony rose from 4 to 46 billion Belgian franc between 1949 and 1960).
 The failure of King Baudouin's second visit to the Belgian Congo in December 1959 which didn't allow the political tensions to be reduced.

The creation of a large scale Belgian-Congolese dialogue was also compatible with a speech from Belgian King Baudouin broadcast on January 13, 1959.
Where he expressed the desire to "lead the Congolese populations, without harmful procrastination, but also without thoughtless haste, toward independence, in prosperity, and in peace."

On January 3, 1960, the Belgian government announced it was convening a round table conference with the goal of helping the Congolese transition from colonial rule to independence.

The Congolese delegations 
A number of traditional chiefs (chefs coutumiers) were invited to the Round Table Conference to reduce the proportion of key independence figures in the delegations. The following is a complete list of the Congolese delegates and their Belgian advisers to the first conference:

Political parties 

 Alliance des Bakongo (ABAKO)
 Effective members - Edmond Nzeza-Nlandu, Joseph Kasa-Vubu, Daniel Kanza
 Deputy members - Philibert Luyeye, Simon Nzeza, Emmanuel Kini, Joseph Yumbu
 Advisors - J. van Bilsen
Alliance des Bayanzi (ABAZI)
 Effective members - Gaston Midu
 Deputy members - Wenceslas Mbueny
Alliance Rural Progressiste (ARP)
 Effective members - Gervais Bahizi, Sangara
 Deputy members - Téodomie Nzamu Kwereka, Albert Kalinda
 Advisers - Coulet
Association Générale des Baluba du Katanga (BALUBAKAT)
 Effective members - Jason Sendwe
 Deputy members - Rémy Mwamba
 Advisers - A. Doucy

Association des Ressortisants du Haut-Congo (ASSORECO)
 Effective members - Jean Bolikango
 Deputy members - Armand Bobanga
 Advisers - Victor Promontorio
Centre du Regroupement Africain (CEREA)
 Effective members - Anicet Kashamura (later replaced by Jean-Chrysostome Weregemere)
 Deputy members - Marcel Bisukiro
 Advisers - J. Terfve
 Confédération des associations tribales du Katanga (CONAKAT)
 Effective members - Moïse Tshombe, Jean-Baptiste Kibwe
 Deputy members - Charles Mutaka, François Kasongo (later transferred and replaced by Prosper Muyumba)
 Advisers - Humblet
Federation Generale du Congo (FGC)
 Effective members - Henri Kasongo
 Advisers - Lacourt
 Mouvement National Congolais-Kalonji (MNC-K)
 Effective members - Albert Kalonji, Joseph Iléo (until 15 January), Paul Ngandu (from 16 January)
 Deputy members - Joseph Ngalula, Muamba, Pierre Missa-Kabu
 Advisers - Jules Gérard-Libois

 Mouvement National Congolais-Lumumba (MNC-L)
 Effective members - Patrice Lumumba, Joseph Kasongo, Jean-Marie Yumba
 Deputy members - Sebastien Ikolo, Jean-Pierre Finant, Bruno Bukasa
 Advisers - E. Loliki
 Parti National du Progrès (PNP)
 Effective members - , Jean-Marie Kititwa, Alphonse Ilunga, Albert Delvaux, Antoine Lopes, André Anekonzapa, Paul Bolya, André-Marie Edindali, Ferdinand Essendja, Léopold Likinda, Sylvestre Mudingayi
 Deputy members - Dominique Mubanga, Joseph Kulumba, Lius Witshima, Michel Atoka, Pierre Mombele, Ignoce Kanga, Revocato Kapepa, Gilbert Pongo, Romain Telu, Victor Kande, Ekwe
 Advisers - H. Simonet, Lebrun, Cambier
Parti du Peuple (PP)
 Effective members - Alphonse Nguvulu
 Deputy members - Antoine Mandungu
 Advisers - F. Périn
 Parti Solidaire Africain (PSA)
Effective members - Cléophas Kamitatu, Sylvain Kama, Justin Matiti
Deputy members - Valentin Lubuma, Christian Mafuta
Advisers - Spitaels-Evrard
 Union Congolaise
 Effective members - Gabriel Kitenge
 Deputy members - Joseph Shango
 Advisers - A. Rubbens

Tribal chieftains 
Équateur Province
 Effective members - Jean-Médard Ilumbe, Eugéne N'Djoku, Innocent Abamba
 Deputy members - Léon Engulu, Mwanga, Mosamba
Kasaï Province
 Effective members - Jonas Mangolo, Emeri Penesenga
 Deputy members - Michel Ohanga, Louis Tshimbambe, Emery Wafwana, Katomba (from 13 February)
Katanga Province
 Effective members - Paul Bako Ditende, Antoine Mwenda-Munongo
 Deputy members - Léon Ilunga, Kasembe, Kabembe
Kivu Province
 Effective members - Henry Simba, Omari Penemizenga
 Deputy members - Joseph Tshomba
Léopoldville Province
 Effective members - Michel Mputela
 Deputy members - Henri Ilenda
Orientale Province
 Effective members - François Kupa, Sabiti Mabe
 Deputy members - Busimbo Yaele, Joachim Bateko, Joseph Lionga

Advisers 
 J. Maisin
 G. Mineur

Other 
Edouard Bayona, a Congolese attaché to the Belgian government, was appointed to attend the conference. Journalist and future Congolese dictator Joseph-Désiré Mobutu attended the conference as Patrice Lumumba's secretary.

Belgian delegation 
On the Belgian side, among others, the following people were present:
 Gaston Eyskens, Prime Minister 
 Albert Lilar, vice Prime Minister
 August De Schryver, Minister of the Belgian Congo and Ruanda-Urundi ;
 Arthur Gilson, Defence Minister
 Pierre Harmel, Minister for the Civil Service

Étienne Davignon, future vice-president of the European Commission, was also at the conference attached to the Belgian Ministry of Foreign Affairs

Lumumba’s eligibility and arrival

Important information regarding the Congolese delegation is the fact that Patrice Emery Lumumba was part of the original delegation. He was in prison. It’s Joseph Kasa-Vubu who put pressure on the Belgian government and demanded the release of Lumumba from prison so that he can join the original delegation in Belgium. Kasa-Vubu was the only person who fought for the release of Lumumba. Hence, the say “Kasa-Vubu made Lumumba as one of the fathers of the Belgian Congo independence… through his released from prison and his subsequent participation in the Round Table” (Nzita Na Nzita). In short “Et Kasa-Vubu ressuscita l’homme politique Lumumba” (Nzita Na Nzita). This is one of the reason Lumumba backed Kasa-Vubu candidacy for the presidency even though Abako was third in the May election (1960). The adage is simple “you scratch my back I’ll scratch yours in turn” which nowadays can be interpreted as a “win-win situation” for both of them Kasa-Vubu and Lumumba. In this respect, the Round Table organized a vote that consisted of fourteen questions. Question 9 dealt with Lumumba’s case since His criminal record was already tainted as he was already convicted by the colonial justice for embezzlement of public funds of the PTT (Telegraph and Telephone Post) of the city of Stanleyville. Question 9 was formulated as follows:” Is it necessary to provide for a softening to the exclusion provisions at eligibility (amendment written by ABAKO-PSA-MNC-PP so as to enable Lumumba's eligibility?” The result was as follows: Out of the 11 political groups, six political groups voted "yes". They included Cartel (Abako; M. N.C.-Kalonji; P.S.A.; Parti du Peuple; F.G.C.et Abazi), Cerea, M. N.C.-Lumumba, Assoreco, Cartel Katangais (Balubakat-Fedeko-Atcar) et Union Congolaise. Four political groups voted against the motion "no". They were P.N.P., Conakat, Alliance Rurale Progressiste (Kivu), and Délégation des chefs coutumiers. One political group, Union Congolaise, abstained.

Ruanda-Urundi delegation 
Representatives from Ruanda and Urundi attended in preparation for the independence of their respective territories.

Ruanda 
Gaspard Cyimana, 1st Minister of Finance of Rwanda
Prosper Bwanakweli, Founder and President of RADER party

Urundi 
André Muhirwa, 3rd Prime Minister of Burundi
Joseph Bamina, 6th Prime Minister of Burundi

Prelude 
On the eve of the conference the Congolese delegations held a series of meetings. Concern was expressed by Congolese students in Brussels that disunity in the Congo would prevent the delegates from taking advantage of Belgium's tenuous position. As a result, almost all of the delegations resolved to form a "Common Front" (Front Commun) to present their demands at the conference. That evening the Common Front released its first statement. It was demanded that the negotiations be more than consultative; all decisions reached should be made binding on the Belgian government. It also required that the Congo should immediately be granted independence. De Schryver and the Belgian delegation were shocked by the joint statement, having underestimated the full extent of Congolese discontent and their willingness to cooperate across party lines.

First conference 
The Round Table Conference was opened on January 20 with a speech by Belgian Prime Minister Gaston Eyskens.

Results 
At the end of the conference, the following notable resolutions were adopted:

 The declaration of independence of the Congo on June 30, 1960.
 The principles of the Congolese constitution, voted by the Belgian Parliament in May 1960.
 The structural organisation of the state and the separation of powers.

See also 
 Indépendance Cha Cha, independence song created in conjunction with the conference.
 Table Ronde, a song written about the conference

Notes

Citations

References 

Belgian Congo
1960 in Belgium
1960 in the Republic of the Congo (Léopoldville)
History of the Democratic Republic of the Congo
1960 conferences